Battle of the Nudes is the second solo album by Gordon Downie, lead singer of The Tragically Hip. It was released in 2003.  Most of the tracks are recordings of songs written by Downie with heavy rock accompaniment.

Downie's backing band, credited as "The Country of Miracles", included Julie Doiron, Josh Finlayson and members of The Dinner Is Ruined (Dale Morningstar and Dave Clark).

Production and marketing

The album was recorded and mixed by Morningstar. The cover artwork was created by Montreal artist Jon Claytor.

To overcome the problem of fans creating bootleg recordings instead of buying the CD, Downie collaborated with MapleMusic Recordings to create video recordings of concerts performed in support of the album.  The videos were posted for sale a few days after the concert.

Track listing
All tracks written by Gord Downie unless otherwise noted.
 "Into The Night"
 "Figment"
 "Christmastime In Toronto"
 "Willow Logic"
 "Pascal's Submarine" (Gordon Downie on harmonica and drums) (with the brass section and trumpet solo by Chris Botti)
 "11th Fret"
 "Who By Rote" (Downie, Clark, Doiron, Finlayson, Morningstar, Press)
 "Steeplechase"
 "More Me Less You"
 "We're Hardcore" (Downie, Clark, Finlayson, Morningstar, Press)
 "Pillform No. 2"
 "Pillform No. 1"

References

2003 albums
Gordon Downie albums
Rounder Records albums